John Barry Tablet (also known as Commodore John Barry) is a tablet with a portrait bust in relief of naval officer John Barry by John Francis Paramino, installed in Boston Common in Boston, Massachusetts, United States.

Description
The rectangular tablet features a portrait bust in relief of Barry. An inscription below reads: .

History
The original sculpture was commissioned by the City of Boston in 1948 and cast in bronze in 1949. After being stolen, a granite copy was commissioned and installed in 1977. The original was returned and became part of the collection of the Constitution Museum.

The work was surveyed as part of the Smithsonian Institution's "Save Outdoor Sculpture!" program in 1993.

References

1949 establishments in Massachusetts
1949 sculptures
1977 establishments in Massachusetts
1977 sculptures
Boston Common
Bronze sculptures in Massachusetts
Granite sculptures in Massachusetts
Monuments and memorials in Boston
Outdoor sculptures in Boston
Sculptures of men in Massachusetts